Utah's 1st congressional district serves the northern area of Utah, including the cities of Ogden, Logan, Park City, Layton, Clearfield, Salt Lake City, and the northern half of the Great Salt Lake.

The current member of the United States House of Representatives from the district is Republican Blake Moore.

President George W. Bush received 73% of the vote in this district in 2004. Scoring a Cook Partisan Voting Index (CPVI) of R+26 in 2004, the 1st Congressional District narrowly beat three other Congressional Districts which scored R+25 to become the most Republican district in the nation.

Voting
Results Under Current Lines (Since 2023)

Results Under Old Lines (2013-2023)

Results Under Old Lines (2003-2013)

List of members representing the district 
Until 1913, the district was the only district, elected statewide At-large.

District borders are periodically redrawn and some district residences may no longer be in this district.

Election results

1912
Note: The 1912 election consisted of an all-party election to the two at-large seats. Howell was elected to the first at-large seat, while Johnson was elected to the second at-large seat.

1914

1916

1918

1920

1922

1924

1926

1928

1930

1932

1934

1936

1938

1940

1942

1944

1946

1948

1950

1952

1954

1956

1958

1960

1962

1964

1966

1968

1970

1972

1974

1976

1978

1980

1982

1984

1986

1988

1990

1992

1994

1996

1998

2000

2002

2004

2006

2008

2010

2012

2014

2016

2018

2020

2022

Historical district boundaries

See also

Utah's congressional districts
List of United States congressional districts

References

 Congressional Biographical Directory of the United States 1774–present

01